The Leningrad Military District was a military district of the Armed Forces of the Russian Federation. In 2010 it was merged with the Moscow Military District, the Northern Fleet and the Baltic Fleet to form the new Western Military District.

History
The Leningrad Military District was originally formed as the Petrograd Military District after the October Revolution of 1917 up to the beginning of the formation of the Red Army. The Petrograd District was established as a part of the Red Army (RKKA) by order в"– 71 of the Highest Military Council of 6 September 1918. On 1 February 1924, by the order в"– 126 the Revolutionary Military Councils of the USSR the Petrograd military district was renamed the Leningrad Military District. Markian Popov was appointed District Commander in 1939. Its main purpose was the defence of the Kola Peninsula and the northern shores of the Gulf of Finland. On the right flank it bordered with the Arkhangelsk Military District, on the left — with the Baltic MD. Among the defensive works started in the 1930s to protect the frontiers was the Karelian Fortified Region.

World War II 
The Winter War of 1939–40 with Finland prompted a close examination of the combat performance of the District’s troops, and for the better control of the 7th and 13th Armies the North-Western Front was formed from the staff of the District on 7 January 1940. Three and a half months later the Front was dissolved back into the District headquarters.

On June 9, 1940, directive 02622ss/ov was given to the District by Semyon Timoshenko to be ready by June 12 to (a) capture the vessels of the Estonian, Latvian and Lithuanian Navy in their bases and/or at sea; (b) Capture the Estonian and Latvian commercial fleet and all other vessels; (c) Prepare for an invasion and landing in Tallinn and Paldiski; (d) Close the Gulf of Riga and blockade the coasts of Estonia and Latvia in Gulf of Finland and Baltic Sea; (e) Prevent an evacuation of the Estonian and Latvian governments, military forces and assets; (f) Provide naval support for an invasion towards Rakvere; (g) Prevent the Estonian and Latvian airplanes flying either to Finland or Sweden.

On 22 June 1941 the District comprised the 7th Army, the 14th Army, the 23rd Army, the 1st Mechanised Corps (-), 177th Rifle Division, 191st Rifle Division, 8th Rifle Division, the 21st, 22nd, 25th, 29th Fortified Regions, Air Forces (six aviation divisions, including the 1st, 2nd, 5th, 39th, 41st, and 55th), and other formations and units.

Two days after the German invasion of the Soviet Union, on 24 June 1941, the District was reorganised as the Northern Front, and two months later, on 23 August 1941, it was split into the Leningrad and Karelian Fronts. The Front’s forces efforts played a major part in resisting the German attacks during the Siege of Leningrad.

By the joint efforts of troops of the Leningrad Front, Volkhov Front, and the 2nd Baltic Front during January 1944 the Leningrad–Novgorod Offensive ended the siege of the city. Pressing home the attack, the forces of the Leningrad Front in summer and in the fall of 1944 helped seize Estonia, Latvia, and Lithuania. The Front was reorganized under the Leningrad District into a peacetime status on 9 July 1945. Marshal Leonid Govorov took command shortly afterwards.

Cold War 

By 1946 the 2nd Guards Artillery Division had arrived at Pushkin, which would be its headquarters for nearly the next fifty years. In 1949 the 76th Air Army became the district's Soviet Air Forces component, after the 13th Air Army was redesignated. General-Colonel of Aviation Fedor Polynin was the first commander of the 76th Air Army. Apart from a brief period when the air army was redesignated the Air Forces of the Leningrad Military District from 1980 to 1988, the 76th Air Army would be active in the region until 1998.

General, later Marshal, Sergei Sokolov assumed command in 1965. On 22 February 1968, in conjunction with the 50th anniversary of the Soviet Army and for its successes in combat and in political training, the District was awarded the Order of Lenin. Marshal Sokolov later became the Minister of Defence in 1984.

In May 1960 the Northern Military District was subsumed into the Leningrad Military District, and Headquarters Northern Military District became Headquarters 6th Army. Among the district's divisions at the time was the 156th Motor Rifle Division, formerly the 25th Rifle Division. In 1965 the 156th Motor Rifle Division became the 37th Motor Rifle Division.

Up to 1967 the 44th Army Corps was located in Arkhangelsk, and then its headquarters was relocated in Transbaikalia, where it was deployed in the 29 Army. This is probably the former 116th Rifle Corps, raised in 1946 within 2nd Shock Army in Germany.

On 3 June 1968 the District was placed on alert. The Norwegian Army raised its alert levels in response. Within a couple of days the mobilized forces in the Leningrad region reached 11,000 soldiers, 4,000 naval infantry,  210 tanks, 500 troop transports, 265 self-propelled cannons, 1,300 logistics transports, 50 helicopters and 20 Antonov An-12 transport aircraft, all of which were staged in the Petchenga-Murmansk area near Norway. On the evening of 7 June, the Norwegian Garnisonen i Sør-Varanger garrison heard the noise of powerful engines coming from the manoeuvres along the entire Soviet front of the Norwegian-Soviet border. Actual observations were not possible over the border in the dark. On that same night the GSV commanding officer ordered all GSV reserve forces to report to their emergency muster locations. The Soviet demonstration of strength lasted until 10 June, when the Soviet forces stood down.

In 1979, Scott and Scott reported the headquarters address as Leningrad, L-13, Pod'ezdnoy Per., Dom 4.

In 1988 the district's forces were reported as consisting of the 6th Army (Petrozavodsk) with the 54th (Alakurtti), 111th (Sortavala) and 131st Motor Rifle Divisions, plus three zero-strength mobilisation divisions at Petrozavodsk, Alakurtti, and Nagornyy; the 26th Army Corps at Arkhangelsk, formed in 1967, with the 69th (Vologda) and 77th Guards Motor Rifle Divisions (Arkhangelsk), the 258th Independent Helicopter Squadron at Luostari/Pechenga airfield near Luostari, and other smaller units; the 30th Guards Leningrad Red Banner Army Corps at Vyborg, with the 45th Guards Motor Rifle Division, the 64th Guards Motor Rifle Division, and the 37th Motor Rifle Division (a mobilisation division, the double of the 63 MRTD) at Chernaya Rechka; and the 63rd Guards Training Motor Rifle Division, and the 76th Guards Airborne Division, under district control. At Vladimirsky Lager was the 250th Reserve ('Spare') Motor Rifle Division, at Garbolovo ([60 20 14N, 30 29 55E]) the 36th Air Assault Brigade (effectively an airmobile brigade), which had been activated in 1979, the 229th Rear Defence Division, and at Pavlovsk the 2nd Guards Artillery Division. There were also the 21st Rocket Brigade at Oselki and the 131st Rocket Brigade at Luga.

In 1989 V.I. Feskov et al. reported that the 69th Guards MRD had become the 5189th Base for Storage of Weapons and Equipment (Russian acronym VKhVT), the 71st became the 5186th VKhVT, the 115th Guards became a storage base, and the 146th Motor Rifle Division was reduced to become the 3807th Base for Storage of Weapons and Equipment.

The 36th Landing-Assault Brigade was under district control until June 1990, when it was transferred to the Soviet Airborne Troops. Becoming part of the Russian Airborne Troops as the country dissolved, it was active until February 1997.
In 1990 the 37th MRD became a weapons and equipment storage base (seemingly by 1990), the 63rd Guards became the 56th Guards District Training Centre, and the 77th Guards was converted to a coastal defence division of the Northern Fleet by 1990. It was then reorganised as a separate coastal defence brigade by 1 December 1994.

In 1993 the 5189th Base for Storage of Weapons and Equipment was disbanded.

Post-Cold War
The fall of the Soviet Union caused much reassessment of the Russian Federation’s military situation. During most of the 1990s, economic constraints greatly hampered military effectiveness. Several formations, such as the 25th Guards Motor Rifle Brigade, formed on 1 January 1993 from the disbanding 24th Tank Training Division at Riga, arrived in the district having been withdrawn from the former Baltic Military District. Since 1992 many formations and units of the District have participated in local conflicts and peace-keeping missions, especially in the North Caucasus.

The 111th Motor Rifle Division (still part of 6th Army) was active until 1994, and then seemingly became the 20th Independent MR Bde, which became a VKhVT between January 1997 and June 1998. As the 20th Independent Motor Rifle Brigade it shifted formations into the 30th Guards Army Corps. Also in 1994 the 5186th VkHVT at Petrozavodsk was seemingly upgraded into the 30th Independent Motor Rifle Brigade.

In early December 1997, President Boris Yeltsin said in Sweden that Russia would make unilateral reductions to forces in the northwest, which included the Leningrad Military District. He promised that land and naval units would be reduced by 40 per cent by January 1999. In May 1999, when Russian defense minister Marshal Igor Sergeyev confirmed that the cuts had taken place, Sergeyev said that the personnel of the Leningrad Military District had been drawn down by 52 per cent. In terms of formations, the series of disbandments left the district almost unrecognisable. The 6th Army’s staff at Petrozavodsk, the staff of the 30th Guards Army Corps at Vyborg, and all the motor rifle divisions previously in the district disbanded (including the 54th Guards MRD, reduced in size to a brigade and then which became a storage base, and the 64th Guards, reduced to a storage base). Left in their place were a number of weapons and equipment storage sites, and two motor rifle brigades (between January 1997 and June 1998 the 45th Guards MRD was reduced in size to become the 138th Guards Motor Rifle Brigade, and the 131st was reduced in size to become the 200th Independent Motor Rifle Brigade).

In terms of air forces, after the collapse of the Soviet Union the 76th Army of the Soviet Air Forces and the 6th Air Army of the Soviet Air Defence Forces, were left operating in the district. The two forces were merged as the 6th Army of VVS and PVO in 1998.The 138th Guards Motor Rifle Brigade at Kamenka was deployed for operations during the Second Chechen War, in which, along with other Russian Ground Forces units, its personnel was reported to have behaved badly at times. A 22-year-old woman in Ingushetia was shot by drunken soldiers from the brigade scavenging for alcohol. The deployment of a tank battalion of the brigade was apparently halted when it was
discovered that soldiers had been selling the explosive from their tanks' reactive armour.
The second fully operational brigade in the district, the 200th Motor Rifle Brigade descends from the World War II-era 45th Rifle Division, which later became the 131st Motor Rifle Division.

In 2006–07, the 35th Base for Storage of Weapons & Equipment, the former 54th Motor Rifle Division at Alakurtti, was disbanded.

The Russian Airborne Troops' 76th Air Assault Division was also based within the district's boundaries, at Pskov.

Presidential Decree 900 dated July 27, 1998 gave the District's composition as the Republic of Karelia, the Komi Republic, Arkhangelsk, Vologda, Leningrad, Murmansk, Novgorod, and Pskov oblasts, Saint Petersburg, and the Nenets Autonomous Okrug. The district headquarters is now in the General Staff Building on Palace Square in Saint Petersburg.

The last commander of the district, General Lieutenant Nikolai Bogdanovsky, commanded between March 2009 and September 2010. On the abolition of the district General Bogdansky became Deputy Commander of the Russian Ground Forces.

Subordinate Units 

Order of Lenin Leningrad Military District 2010:

 Combat formations:
 25th independent Guards Motor-Rifle Brigade "Sevastopol – Latvian Rifles", in Vladimirsky Lager equipped with MT-LBV
 138th Guards Motor Rifle Brigade "Krasnoselskaya", in Kamenka equipped with MT-LBV] (former 45th Guards MRD)
 200th Independent Motor Rifle Brigade "Pechenga", in Pechenga equipped with MT-LBV
 216th Reserve Base (4th Independent Motor-Rifle Brigade), in Petrozavodsk
 2nd Independent Spetsnaz Brigade, in Cherekhi
 56th Guards District Training Center "Krasnoselskyy"
 Missile and Artillery formations:
 26th Missile Brigade "Nemanskaya", in Luga
 9th Guards Artillery Brigade "Kelecko-Berlin", in Luga
 7014th Artillery Reserve Base, in Luga
 Air-defence formations:
 5th Anti-Aircraft Rocket Brigade equipped with the Buk missile system
 1013th Air-defence Center
 Engineering formations:
 140th Guards Engineer Regiment "Kingisepskyy", in Kerro Vsevolozhskyy
 7022nd Engineer Reserve Base
 NBC-defence formations:
 10th Independent NBC-defence Battalion, in Sertolovo
 Signal formations:
 95th (Communications Hub) Signal Brigade "50th years of USSR"
 132nd (Territorial) Signal Brigade "Konstancskaya"
 60th Signal Center
 1269th Independent Electronic Warfare Center
 140th Independent (Rear) Signal Battalion

Commanders 
During its existence, the district was commanded by the following officers:
Boris Pozern (1918–1919)
Dmitry Nikolayevich Avrov 1920–1921
Alexander Yegorov 1921
Vladimir Gittis 1921–1925
Boris Shaposhnikov 1925–1927
August Kork 1927–1928
Mikhail Tukhachevsky 1928–1931
Ivan Panfilovich Belov 1931–1935
Komandarm 1st rank Boris Shaposhnikov (September 1935–June 1937)
Komandarm 2nd rank Pavel Dybenko (June–10 September 1937)
Mikhail Khozin 1937–1939
Komandarm 2nd rank Kirill Meretskov (January 1939–January 1940)
Komandarm 1st rank (promoted to Marshal of the Soviet Union May 1940) Semyon Timoshenko (January–June 1940)
Lieutenant General Mikhail Kirponos (June 1940–January 1941)
Lieutenant General Markian Popov (January–June 1941)
Lieutenant General Trifon Shevaldin (July–September 1941)
Marshal of the Soviet Union Leonid Govorov (July 1945 – April 1946)
Lieutenant General Dmitry Gusev (April 1946 – September 1949)
Lieutenant General Alexander Luchinsky (September 1949 – May 1953)
General of the Army Matvei Zakharov (May 1953 – October 1957)
General of the Army Nikolay Krylov (January 1958 – October 1960)
General of the Army Mikhail Kazakov (October 1960 – October 1965)
Lieutenant General Sergei Sokolov (October 1965 – April 1967)
Lieutenant General Ivan Shavrov (May 1967 – January 1973)
Lieutenant General Anatoly Gribkov (February 1973 – September 1976)
 Colonel General Mikhail Sorokin (October 1976 – October 1981)
General of the Army Boris Snetkov (November 1981 – December 1987)
 Colonel General Viktor Yermakov (December 1987 – July 1990)
 Colonel General Viktor Samsonov (July 1990–December 1991)
 Lieutenant General Sergey Seleznyov (7 December 1991 – 17 December 1996; appointed by USSR President Gorbachev as of 7 Dec 1991)
 Lieutenant General (promoted to Colonel General May 1997 and General of the Army February 2003) Valentin Bobryshev (December 1996–9 March 2005)
 General of the Army Igor Puzanov (9 March 2005 – 11 December 2007)
 Colonel General Valery Gerasimov (11 December 2007 – 5 February 2009)
 Lieutenant General Nikolai Bogdanovsky (23 March 2009–September 2010)

Notes

References
Russian official site at www.mil.ru
Scott and Scott, The Armed Forces of the USSR, Eastview, 1979
See Also – Leningrad MD at Warfare.ru

Military districts of the Soviet Union
Military districts of the Russian Federation
Military units and formations disestablished in 2010